Ayoola Ayolola (born January 12, 1987) is a Nigerian musician, singer, and actor. He won the 5th Project Fame West Africa on September 29, 2012.

Early life and education
Ayolola was born in Kano, northern Nigeria. He is the oldest of five children. He attended Covenant University, Ota, Ogun State where he studied biochemistry.

Career

Project Fame West Africa
Ayolola won the 5th edition of the Project Fame West Africa, where he was gifted a car, 2.5 million naira cash price and a year recording deal. He previously participated in another singing contest Nigerian Idol where he got evicted in the first round after making the final 12.

Acting career
Ayolola suspended his music career for acting in 2015, he featured as Mide in the YouTube series Skinny Girl in Transit afterwards. He also featured in movies such as Isoken.

Filmography

TV shows

Films

Exit from The Men's Club 
Tola Odunsi, the director of The Men's Club announced that Ayolola will no longer be playing the lead role of Aminu Garba via an Instagram post as he was unavailable to play the role. He was to be replaced by the former Big Brother Naija housemate, Pere Egbi. Due to speculation that he relocated without notifying the show runners, Ayolola reacted to the announcent via his Instagram page writing “Contrary to what was said, I did not relocate without letting the executive producers and producers of the show know, My decision to make a ‘temporary’ move out of the country was a long thought out process in which the producer/my manager at the time was aware of and involved in. With that being said, I cannot wait to be back on your screens again."

References

External links

1987 births
Living people
21st-century Nigerian male actors
21st-century Nigerian singers
Covenant University alumni
Actors from Kano
Musicians from Kano
21st-century Nigerian male singers
Nigerian male television actors
Nigerian male film actors
Nigerian male musicians